Pimelephila is a genus of moths of the family Crambidae. It contains only one species, Pimelephila ghesquierei, is found in Benin, the Democratic Republic of Congo (Katanga, East Kasai, Equateur) and Ghana.

The larvae feed on Elaeis guineensis and Ancistrophyllum secundiflorum.

References

Natural History Museum Lepidoptera genus database

Pyraustinae
Crambidae genera